is a Japanese professional wrestler currently working for the Japanese promotions World Wonder Ring Stardom.

Professional wrestling career

Actwres girl'Z (2020-2021)
Sakurai made her professional wrestling debut at AWG Act 46, an event promoted by Actwres girl'Z on February 11, 2020, where she fell short to Miku Aono. At Ice Ribbon/AWG Ice Ribbon & Actwres girl'Z Joint Show  on November 16, 2020, she teamed up with Maya Yukihi to defeat Miku Aono and Nao Ishikawa.

World Wonder Ring Stardom (2021-present)
Sakurai made her debut in World Wonder Ring Stardom in the sixth night of the Stardom 5 Star Grand Prix 2021 from August 13 where she unsuccessfully challenged Unagi Sayaka for the Future of Stardom Championship. After the match she was presented as the newest member of Cosmic Angels and was announced to undergo a newcomer "challenge" against ten opponents during the tournament. At Stardom 10th Anniversary Grand Final Osaka Dream Cinderella on October 9, 2021, Sakurai teamed up with Mina Shirakawa in a losing effort against Marvelous (Rin Kadokura and Maria). Due to Unagi Sayaka and Mina Shirakawa starting feeling underappreciated by the leader Tam Nakano and due to doubting Sakurai and Tsukiyama the newcomers, tensions raised in the Cosmic Angels unit in November 2021, aspect which led to inner clashes between stablemates. At Kawasaki Super Wars, the first event of the Stardom Super Wars trilogy from November 3, 2021, Sakurai defeated stablemate Waka Tsukiyama in a match in which had Sakurai lost, she must have left the Cosmic Angels unit. At Tokyo Super Wars on November 27, 2021, Tsukiyama unsuccessfully challenged Ruaka and Waka Tsukiyama in a three-way match for the Future of Stardom Championship. At Osaka Super Wars from December 18, 2021, she teamed up with Waka Tsukiyama and Lady C to unsuccessfully challenge Syuri in a 3-on-1 handicap gauntlet match. Sakurai competed in the 2021 edition of the Goddesses of Stardom Tag League where she teamed up with Unagi Sayaka and scored a total of four points after going against FWC (Hazuki and Koguma), AphrOditE (Utami Hayashishita and Saya Kamitani), Himepoi '21 (Himeka and Natsupoi), I love HigashiSpo! (Saki Kashima and Fukigen Death), and Water & Oil (Hanan and Rina). At Stardom Dream Queendom on December 29, 2021, she teamed up with Mina Shirakawa and Unagi Sayaka to unsuccessfully challenge MaiHimePoi (Maika, Natsupoi and Himeka) in a Six-woman tag team match for the Artist of Stardom Championship.

At Stardom Nagoya Supreme Fight on January 29, 2022, Sakurai competed in a five-way elimination match won by Momo Kohgo and also involving Waka Tsukiyama, Fukigen Death, Saki Kashima. On February 12, 2022 at Stardom in Osaka, after teaming up with stablemates Tam Nakano and Unagi Sayaka in a losing effort against Donna Del Mondo's Giulia, Thekla and Mirai, Sakurai decided to leave Cosmic Angels and join Donna Del Mondo after stating that she wanted to wrestle instead of just dancing.

References

1990 births
Living people
Japanese female professional wrestlers
People from Chiba Prefecture